Creighton University Medical Center - Bergan Mercy (formerly known as Creighton University Medical Center-Saint Joseph Hospital) is a hospital located in Central Omaha, Nebraska in the United States. On April 24, 2012, CUMC signed an agreement to be part of the Alegent Health System (now CHI Health) during the summer of 2012. The CUMC-Saint Joseph Hospital closed June 9, 2017 while simultaneously the academic medical center and trauma services opened at CHI Health Creighton University Medical Center – Bergan Mercy. The building has been remodeled into apartments by NuStyle Development, and opened in June 2018. The apartment complex is now called "The Atlas".

History 

St. Joseph's Mercy Hospital was founded on September 25, 1870, at 12th and Mason Streets by the Sisters of Mercy. This hospital was a plain wood-frame building with two wards and ten rooms. In 1880, the Sisters of St. Francis took over management of the hospital and renamed it The Creighton Memorial Hospital. By 1882 an addition was required to keep up with care demands.
In 1892, John A. Creighton established the John A. Creighton Medical College along with a 200-bed hospital. The new hospital was built at 10th and Castelar Streets at a cost of $200,000, and was called the Creighton Memorial St. Joseph Hospital. At this time, the hospital became the primary resource for clinical instruction in the medical school.  Several additions to the building were made at this location over the years.

In 1978 the hospital moved to its facility at 30th and California Streets.

American Medical International acquired St. Joseph Hospital in 1984; Tenet Healthcare acquired American Medical in 1995. In 2012, Tenent and Creighton University sold the hospital to Alegent Health (now CHI Health).

The hospital is the teaching hospital for Creighton University's College of Medicine, College of Pharmacy, College of Nursing, College of Dentistry and the School of Pharmacy and Health Professions.

The hospital has gone through several name changes, beginning as Creighton Memorial, then Saint Joseph Hospital, Saint Joseph Hospital at Creighton University Medical Center, Creighton University Medical Center, and most recently, after a relocation to Mercy St., Creighton University Medical Center - Bergan Mercy.

CHI Health Creighton University Medical Center closed the building at 601 N 30th Street in June 2017, moving its trauma services to CHI Health Bergan Mercy and opening its University Campus location at 2412 Cuming Street. The new facility has an emergency department, several observation rooms, a pharmacy and various outpatient clinics. Any patients needing admission are transferred to another hospital.

See also 

 CHI Health
 List of hospitals in Omaha, Nebraska

References

External links 

 Historic images Old St. Joseph Hospital, Omaha, Nebraska - Nebraska Memories
 Creighton University Medical Center - Bergan Mercy

Hospitals in Omaha, Nebraska
Hospital buildings completed in 1892
Hospital buildings completed in 1978
Tenet Healthcare
Christian hospitals
Creighton University
North Omaha, Nebraska
Hospitals established in 1870
1870 establishments in Nebraska